Life Sux is an EP by the artist Wavves released September 20, 2011 on the record label Ghost Ramp. It features collaborations with Best Coast and Fucked Up.

Release
Prior to the release of the EP, the song "I Wanna Meet Dave Grohl" was featured on the premier of the MTV show "I Just Want My Pants Back". "Post Acid", the lead single from Wavves' 2010 album, King of the Beach, would also appear in the show.

Life Sux was released on vinyl, CD, and as a digital download through iTunes. As a bonus, the first 420 people to pre-order the vinyl received a limited edition green vinyl. The album peaked at #11 on the Billboard Heatseekers chart.

Track listing

References

2011 EPs
Noise pop EPs
Wavves albums